This Time Around is an album by the American soul musician Otis Clay, released in 1998. It was his first studio album in five years, and came about due to a desire to record in Memphis again.

Production
The album was produced by Willie Mitchell. The Memphis Horns and the Hi Rhythm Section contributed to the album; Cash McCall and Preston Shannon added guitar parts. Willie Hutch wrote "I Can Handle It" and "You're the One I Choose".

Critical reception

The Chicago Reader thought that "this is no exercise in nostalgia: swirling strings, horns so choppy and precise they almost sound synthesized, and a serpentine pop-funk melody line all proclaim it a decidedly contemporary soul-blues outing." The Washington Post determined that "Clay reaffirms his lofty place in soul music with a baritone voice that sounds more burnished and persuasive than ever." Esquire deemed it a "slick, hugely enjoyable comeback album."

The Age concluded that Clay "bristles with intensity on the caustic 'Standing in the Rain' and 'City in the Sky', but 'You're the One I Choose' and the easy-listening 'You Want Me To' detract from his natural soul power." The Independent noted that Willie Mitchell "has largely recreated the sound with which he helped Al Green to best Clay first time around." The Pittsburgh Post-Gazette opined that "the soulmeister is in fine and mellow form, testifying on breaking hearts, aching hearts and hearts on the mend." The Commercial Appeal argued that "Clay's has been a trustworthy, albeit sad-eyed, voice: the friend who breaks the bad news; the relative who sits you down for a heart to heart."

AllMusic wrote that "the backing musicians all have long pedigrees in Memphis soul music circles, either working at Stax or with producer Mitchell."

Track listing

References

1998 albums
Albums produced by Willie Mitchell (musician)